The 2010 Bolivian regional elections were held on 4 April 2010. Departmental and municipal authorities were elected by an electorate of approximately 5 million people. Among the officials  elected are:
 Governors of all nine departments
 Members of Departamental Legislative Assemblies in each department; 23 seats in these Assemblies will represent indigenous communities, and have been selected by traditional usos y costumbres in the weeks prior to the election
 Provincial Subgovernors and Municipal Corregidors (executive authorities) in Beni
 Sectional Development Executives at the provincial level in Tarija
 Mayors and Council members in all 337 municipalities
 The five members of the Regional Assembly in the autonomous region of Gran Chaco

Political parties participating
The political parties contesting elections in each department are as follows:
Beni: Amazon Convergence (Convergencia Amazónica), Beni First (Primero El Beni), Revolutionary Nationalist Movement (Movimiento Nacionalista Revolucionario; MNR), Movement towards Socialism (Movimiento Al Socialismo - Instrumento Político por la Soberanía de los Pueblos; MAS-IPSP), and Autonomous Nationalities for Change and Empowerment (Nacionalidades Autónomas por el Cambio y Empoderamiento; NACER).
Chuquisaca:We are all Chuquisaca (Chuquisaca somos Todos, a coalition of the National Unity Front and Popular Consensus), Renewing Freedom and Democracy (Libertad y Democracia Renovadora), Falange April 19, Without Fear Movement (Movimiento sin Miedo; MSM), and Movement towards Socialism.
Cochabamba: All for Cochabamba (Todos por Cochabamba), Revolutionary Nationalist Movement, Without Fear Movement, and Movement towards Socialism.
La Paz:National Unity Front (Frente de Unidad Nacional), Patriotic Social Alliance (Alianza Social Patriótica), Revolutionary Nationalist Movement, Movement towards Socialism, Without Fear Movement, and Movement for Sovereignty (Movimiento por la Soberanía).
Oruro: National Unity Front (Frente de Unidad Nacional), Revolutionary Nationalist Movement, Movement towards Socialism, and Without Fear Movement.
Pando: Popular Consensus (Consenso Popular), Without Fear Movement, and Movement towards Socialism.
Potosí: Potosí Regional Civic Front (Frente Cívico Regional Potosinista), Uqarikuna Citizen Association (Agrupación Ciudadana Uqarikuna), Social Alliance (Alianza Social), Revolutionary Nationalist Movement, Movement towards Socialism.
Santa Cruz: Broad Front of Revolutionary Nationalist Movement and Autonomy for Bolivia (Frente Amplio), All for Santa Cruz (Todos por Santa Cruz), Nationalist Citizen Force (Fuerza Ciudadana Nacionalista), Truth and Social Democracy (Verdad y Democracía Social-Verdes), Without Fear Movement, and Movement towards Socialism.
Tarija: Path towards Change (Camino al Cambio (Alianza Departamental)), National Autonomous Power (Poder Autonómico Nacional), and Movement towards Socialism.

Including these parties, a total of 191 political forces contested municipal elections. Only the Movement towards Socialism was involved in all 337 municipal contests. Other parties participating in large numbers of contests are as follows:

Irregularities, alleged fraud, and additional voting
Irregularities and fraud in the voting have been alleged in at least four departments, those of the so-called media luna, Beni, Pando, Tarija, and Santa Cruz. In all four departments, the MAS-IPSP has denounced fraud and called for legal action against those responsible, some times joined by opposing political parties. Departmental Electoral Courts have invalidated votes at a number of voting tables where fraud or irregularities have been confirmed. Voters enrolled at these tables were called to cast votes again on April 18.

In Santa Cruz, the Departmental Electoral Court annulled the results of 117 voting tables on April 11, mostly in the capital province of Andrés Ibáñez, but also in Warnes, Obispo Santistevan, Germán Busch, Cordillera, Guarayos, Ñuflo de Chávez, Vallegrande, Chiquitos, Ichilo, and other locations. 25,124 voters are entitled to a revote, about 2.7% of the department's total electorate. The president of the Court declared "We are going to repeat these acts because there was crime. The quantity of votes was altered and modified; someone interfered in the act, and that is a crime." The pro-MAS Departmental Worker's Central (Central Obrero Departamental) is calling for a revote in the entire department.
In Beni, the MAS has alleged fraud, including at the electoral table of its candidate, Jessica Jordan.The Departmental Electoral Court has not annulled any results, and fraud accusations are being considered by the prosecutor's office.
In La Paz, the Departmental Electoral Court found irregularities in 27 electoral tables, where the number of recorded votes exceeded the number of voters, although often by only one or two votes. These tables were annulled and will be re-voted. Officials considered both mathematical errors on the part of vote counters and fraud to be possible explanations.
In Pando, the Departmental Electoral Court announced on April 7 that it will conduct a re-vote of 5 voting tables. Those tables are located in the municipalities of Filadelfia (1), El Sena (3), and Nueva Esperanza (1). Opposition senator Eva Gonzales, of Plan Progreso para Bolivia, has called for 18 tables to be re-voted due to electoral fraud.
One table in Oruro will be subject to a re-vote.
Due to a tie, there will be a runoff for the departmental assembly member from Villamontes in the Chaco region.
In the municipality of Pailón, an initial tie between Armando Mamani (of MAS) and Luis Alberto Ruiz (of Todos por Santa Cruz) was broken on 19 April, by the reinstatement of 5 votes for Ruiz by the National Electoral Court. This brought the margin to 1,284-1,279 in Ruiz's favor. The MAS candidate has announced plans to press to change the outcome through a judicial complaint as well as a road blockade.

Results

Departmental results
As of 12 Abril, with counting nearly complete, all Governor's contests were effectively decided. The MAS-IPSP won 6 governorships, in Chuquisaca, Cochabamba, La Paz, Oruro, Pando, and Potosí. Victors in other races were: Beni First's Ernesto Suárez, Rubén Costas of the Greens in Santa Cruz, and Mario Cossío of the Path towards Change in Tarija.

Complete vote totals are as follows:

Beni

|- style="background:#E9E9E9;"
! colspan="2" | Gubernatorial Candidate
! Party
! Votes for Governor
! Percentage
! Assembly Members24 elected by territory
|-
| style="background-color:#7FFF00;" | 
| style="text-align:left;" | Ernesto Suárez
| style="text-align:left;" | Beni First
| style="text-align:right;" | 64.055
| style="text-align:right;" | 42,5%
| style="text-align:right;" | 11
|-
| style="background-color:blue" | 
| style="text-align:left;" |Jessica Jordan
| style="text-align:left;" | Movement for Socialism
| style="text-align:right;" | 60.477
| style="text-align:right;" | 40,1%
| style="text-align:right;" | 10
|-
| style="background-color:pink" | 
| style="text-align:left;" | 
| style="text-align:left;" | Nationalist Revolutionary Movement-Pueblo
| style="text-align:right;" | 18.269
| style="text-align:right;" | 12,1%
| style="text-align:right;" | 3
|-
| style="background-color:green" | 
| style="text-align:left;" | 
| style="text-align:left;" | Amazon Convergence
| style="text-align:right;" | 5.949
| style="text-align:right;" | 3,9%
| style="text-align:right;" | 0
|-
| style="background-color:red" | 
| style="text-align:left;" | 
| style="text-align:left;" | Autonomous Nationalities for Change and Empowerment
| style="text-align:right;" | 1.894
| style="text-align:right;" | 1,3%
| style="text-align:right;" | 0
|-
|
| colspan="2" style="text-align:right;" | Indigenous Representatives
| colspan="2" style="text-align:center;" | Elected through usos y costumbres
| style="text-align:right;" | 2
|-
|
| colspan="2" style="text-align:right;" | Peasant Representatives
| colspan="2" style="text-align:center;" | Elected through usos y costumbres
| style="text-align:right;" | 2
|-
| style="background-color:white" | 
| 
| style="text-align:left;" | Valid votes
| style="text-align:right;" | 150.644
| style="text-align:right;" | 91,6%
|
|-
| style="background-color:white" | 
| 
| style="text-align:left;" | Blank votes
| style="text-align:right;" | 8.739
| style="text-align:right;" | 5,3
|
|-
| style="background-color:white" | 
| 
| style="text-align:left;" | Null votes
| style="text-align:right;" | 5.009
| style="text-align:right;" | 3,0%
|
|-
| style="background-color:white" | 
| 
| style="text-align:left;" | Total votes	
| style="text-align:right;" | 164.392
| style="text-align:right;" | 86,8% of registered voters
| style="text-align:right;" | 28
|-
| colspan="10" style="text-align:left;" | Source: Corte Nacional Electoral, Acto de Computo Nacional
|}

The indigenous representatives were elected separately in an Assembly of the Indigenous People of Beni held in the Pastoral Center of the Apostolic Vicarate of Beni on 22 March 2010. Lola Tabo (of the Cavineño people, nominated by the Central Indígena de la Región Amazónica de Bolivia, CIRABO) and William Cuellar (Sirionó, nominated by the Central de Pueblos Indígenas del Beni, CPIB) were elected as departmental assembly members. Inocencio Yubanure (Mojeño-Ignaciano, nominated by the Central de Pueblos Étnicos Mojeños del Beni, CPEMB) and Dolores Muiba Noza (Mojeño-Trinitario, nominated by the Central de Mujeres Indígenas Beni, CMIB) were the chosen alternates.

Chuquisaca

|- style="background:#E9E9E9;"
! colspan="2" | Gubernatorial Candidate
! Party
! Votes for Governor
! Percentage
! Assembly Members by Territory
! Votes for Assembly by Population
! Percentage
! Assembly Members by Population
! Total Assembly Members	
|-
| style="background-color:blue" | 
| style="text-align:left;" |Esteban Urquizu
| style="text-align:left;" | Movement for Socialism
| 109.270
| 53,6%
| 9
| 90.921
| 53,3%
| 6
| 15
|-
| style="background-color:red" | 
| style="text-align:left;" | Jhon Cava
| style="text-align:left;" | We Are All Chuquisaca
| 72.314
| 35,5%
| 1
| 53.801
| 31,5%
| 3
| 4
|-
| style="background-color:orange" | 
| style="text-align:left;" |
| style="text-align:left;" | Renewing Freedom and Democracy (LIDER)
| 8.752
| 4,3%
| 0
| 10.012
| 5,9%
| 0
| 0
|-
| style="background-color:#7FFF00;" | 
| style="text-align:left;" | Bernabé Paredes
| style="text-align:left;" | Without Fear Movement
| 8.044
| 3,9%
| 0
| 9.799
| 5,7%
| 0
| 0
|-
| style="background-color:black" | 
| style="text-align:left;" | Horacio Poppe
| style="text-align:left;" | Falange F-19
| 5.476
| 2,7%
| 0
| 6.127
| 3,6%
| 0
| 0
|-
|
| colspan="2" style="text-align:right;" | Indigenous Representatives
| colspan="6" style="text-align:center;" | Elected through usos y costumbres by the Guaraní people
| style="text-align:right;" | 2
|-
| style="background-color:white" | 
| 
| style="text-align:left;" | Valid votes
| 203.856
| 86,3%
|
| 170.660
| 72,4%
|
|
|-
| style="background-color:white" | 
| 
| style="text-align:left;" | Blank votes
| style="text-align:right;" | 19.966
| style="text-align:right;" | 8,5%
|
| style="text-align:right;" | 55.051
| style="text-align:right;" | 23,4%
|
|
|-
| style="background-color:white" | 
| 
| style="text-align:left;" | Null votes
| style="text-align:right;" | 12.439
| style="text-align:right;" | 5,3%
|
| style="text-align:right;" | 9.849
| style="text-align:right;" | 4,2%
|
|
|-
| 
| 
| style="text-align:left;" | Total votes	
| style="text-align:right;" | 236.261
| style="text-align:right;" | 86,7% of registered voters
| style="text-align:right;" | 10
| style="text-align:right;" | 235.560
| style="text-align:right;" | 86,4% of registered voters
| style="text-align:right;" | 9
| style="text-align:right;" | 21
|-
| colspan="10" style="text-align:left;" | Source: Corte Nacional Electoral, Acto de Computo Nacional
|}

Cochabamba

|- style="background:#E9E9E9;"
! colspan="2" | Gubernatorial Candidate
! Party
! Votes for Governor
! Percentage
! Assembly Members by Territory
! Votes for Assembly by Population
! Percentage
! Assembly Members by Population
! Total Assembly Members	
|-
| style="background-color:blue" | 
| style="text-align:left;" |Edmundo Novillo Aguilar
| style="text-align:left;" | Movement for Socialism
| style="text-align:right;" | 415.245
| style="text-align:right;" | 61,9%
| style="text-align:right;" | 16
| style="text-align:right;" | 360.785
| style="text-align:right;" | 60,7%
| style="text-align:right;" | 11
| style="text-align:right;" | 27
|-
| style="background-color:yellow" | 
| style="text-align:left;" | Marvell José María Leyes Justiniano
| style="text-align:left;" | National Unity Front-Popular Consensus (All for Cochabamba)
| style="text-align:right;" | 174.175
| style="text-align:right;" | 26,0%
| style="text-align:right;" | 0
| style="text-align:right;" | 147.442
| style="text-align:right;" | 24,8%
| style="text-align:right;" | 4
| style="text-align:right;" | 4
|-
| style="background-color:#7FFF00;" | 
| style="text-align:left;" | José Ronald Del Barco Alcocer
| style="text-align:left;" | Without Fear Movement
| style="text-align:right;" | 52.516
| style="text-align:right;" | 7,8%
| style="text-align:right;" | 0
| style="text-align:right;" | 63.614
| style="text-align:right;" | 10,7%
| style="text-align:right;" | 1
| style="text-align:right;" | 1
|-
| style="background-color:pink" | 
| style="text-align:left;" | María Casta Jaimes Arriaran
| style="text-align:left;" | Nationalist Revolutionary Movement
| style="text-align:right;" | 29.250
| style="text-align:right;" | 4,4
| style="text-align:right;" | 0
| style="text-align:right;" | 22.800
| style="text-align:right;" | 3,8%
| style="text-align:right;" | 0
| style="text-align:right;" | 0 
|-
|
| colspan="2" style="text-align:right;" | Indigenous Representatives
| colspan="6" style="text-align:center;" | Elected through usos y costumbres by the Yuqui and Yuracaré peoples
| style="text-align:right;" | 2
|-
| style="background-color:white" | 
| 
| style="text-align:left;" | Valid votes
| style="text-align:right;" | 671.186
| style="text-align:right;" | 81,9%
|
| style="text-align:right;" | 594.641
| style="text-align:right;" | 72,7%
|
|
|-
| style="background-color:white" | 
| 
| style="text-align:left;" | Blank votes
| style="text-align:right;" | 111.510
| style="text-align:right;" | 13,6
|
| style="text-align:right;" | 183.077
| style="text-align:right;" | 22,4%
|
|
|-
| style="background-color:white" | 
| 
| style="text-align:left;" | Null votes
| style="text-align:right;" | 36.905
| style="text-align:right;" | 4,5%
|
| style="text-align:right;" | 40.713
| style="text-align:right;" | 5,0%
|
|
|-
| style="background-color:white" | 
| 
| style="text-align:left;" | Total votes	
| style="text-align:right;" | 819.601
| style="text-align:right;" | 87,2% of registered voters
| style="text-align:right;" | 16
| style="text-align:right;" | 818.431
| style="text-align:right;" | 87,1% of registered voters
| style="text-align:right;" | 16
| style="text-align:right;" | 34
|-
| colspan="10" style="text-align:left;" | Source: Corte Nacional Electoral, Acto de Computo Nacional
|}

La Paz

Oruro

Pando

|- style="background:#E9E9E9;"
! colspan="2" | Gubernatorial Candidate
! Party
! Votes for Governor
! Percentage
! Assembly Members by Territory
! Total Assembly Members	
|-
| style="background-color:blue" | 
| style="text-align:left;" |Luis Adolfo Flores
| style="text-align:left;" | Movement for Socialism
| 17.192
| 49,7%
| 7
| 7
|-
| style="background-color:orange" | 
| style="text-align:left;" | Paulo Jorge Bravo
| style="text-align:left;" | Popular Consensus
| 16.744
| 48,4%
| 8
| 8
|-
| style="background-color:#7FFF00;" | 
| style="text-align:left;" | Egidio Tuesta
| style="text-align:left;" | Without Fear Movement
| 657
| 1,9%
| colspan="3" style="text-align:center;" | did not contest
|-
|
| colspan="2" style="text-align:right;" | Indigenous Representatives
| colspan="3" style="text-align:center;" | Elected through usos y costumbres
| style="text-align:right;" | 1
|-
| style="background-color:white" | 
| 
| style="text-align:left;" | Valid votes
| 34.593
| 93,4%
|
|
|-
| style="background-color:white" | 
| 
| style="text-align:left;" | Blank votes
| style="text-align:right;" | 1.292
| style="text-align:right;" | 3,5%
|
|
|-
| style="background-color:white" | 
| 
| style="text-align:left;" | Null votes
| style="text-align:right;" | 1.168
| style="text-align:right;" | 3,2%
|
|
|-
| 
| 
| style="text-align:left;" | Total votes	
| style="text-align:right;" | 37.053
| style="text-align:right;" | 85,5% of registered voters
| style="text-align:right;" | 15
| style="text-align:right;" | 16
|-
| colspan="7" style="text-align:left;" | Source: Corte Nacional Electoral, Acto de Computo Nacional
|}

Potosí

|- style="background:#E9E9E9;"
! colspan="2" | Gubernatorial Candidate
! Party
! Votes for Governor
! Percentage
! Assembly Members by Territory
! Votes for Assembly by Population
! Percentage
! Assembly Members by Population
! Total Assembly Members	
|-
| style="background-color:blue" | 
| style="text-align:left;" |Félix Gonzáles
| style="text-align:left;" | Movement for Socialism
| 163.989
| 66,8%
| 16
| 123.663
| 63,1%
| 11
| 27
|-
| style="background-color:green" | 
| style="text-align:left;" | Richard Alejo
| style="text-align:left;" | Social Alliance
| 31.564
| 12,9%
| 0
| 39.152
| 20,0%
| 3
| 4
|-
| style="background-color:yellow" | 
| style="text-align:left;" | Orlando Careaga
| style="text-align:left;" | Uqarikuna Citizen Association
| 27.873
| 11,4%
| 0
| 13.569
| 6,9%
| 1
| 1
|-
| style="background-color:orange" | 
| style="text-align:left;" | Miguel Ángel Pineda
| style="text-align:left;" | Potosí Regional Civic Front
| 15.960
| 6,5%
| 0
| 14.275
| 7,3%
| 1
| 1
|-
| style="background-color:pink" | 
| style="text-align:left;" | Guillermo Condori Ramos
| style="text-align:left;" | Revolutionary Nationalist Movement
| 6.066
| 2,5%
| 0
| 5.171
| 2,6%
| 0
| 0
|-
| style="background-color:white" | 
| 
| style="text-align:left;" | Valid votes
| 245.452
| 80,4%
|
| 195.830
| 64,2%
|
|
|-
| style="background-color:white" | 
| 
| style="text-align:left;" | Blank votes
| style="text-align:right;" | 37.311
| style="text-align:right;" | 12,2%
|
| style="text-align:right;" | 96.033
| style="text-align:right;" | 31,5%
|
|
|-
| style="background-color:white" | 
| 
| style="text-align:left;" | Null votes
| style="text-align:right;" | 22.599
| style="text-align:right;" | 7,4%
|
| style="text-align:right;" | 13.226
| style="text-align:right;" | 4,3%
|
|
|-
| 
| 
| style="text-align:left;" | Total votes	
| style="text-align:right;" | 305.362
| style="text-align:right;" | 83,2% of registered voters
| style="text-align:right;" | 16
| style="text-align:right;" | 305.089
| style="text-align:right;" | 83,1% of registered voters
| style="text-align:right;" | 16
| style="text-align:right;" | 32
|-
| colspan="10" style="text-align:left;" | Source: Corte Nacional Electoral, Acto de Computo Nacional
|}

Santa Cruz

|- style="background:#E9E9E9;"
! colspan="2" style="text-align:center;" | Gubernatorial Candidate
! style="text-align:center;" | Party
! style="text-align:center;" | Votes for Governor
! style="text-align:center;" | Percentage
! style="text-align:center;" | Assembly Members by Territory
! style="text-align:center;" | Votes for Assembly by Population
! style="text-align:center;" | Percentage
! style="text-align:center;" | Assembly Members by Population
! style="text-align:center;" | Total Assembly Members	
|-
| style="background-color:green" | 
| style="text-align:left;" | Rubén Armando Costas Aguilera
| style="text-align:left;" | Truth and Social Democracy (Verdes)
| 515.370
| 52,6%
| 7
| 411.019
| 50,6%
| 5
| 12
|-
| style="background-color:blue" | 
| style="text-align:left;" |Jerjes Justiniano Talavera
| style="text-align:left;" | Movement for Socialism
| 374.326
| 38,2%
| 6
| 294.948
| 36,3%
| 3
| 9
|-
| style="background-color:orange" | 
| style="text-align:left;" | Juan Carlos Urenda
| style="text-align:left;" | All for Santa Cruz
| 43.929
| 4,5%
| 0
| 46.591
| 5,7%
| 0
| 0
|-
| style="background-color:pink" | 
| style="text-align:left;" | Willams Paniagua Yépez
| style="text-align:left;" | Broad Front of Revolutionary Nationalist Movement and Autonomy for Bolivia
| 25.031
| 2,6%
| 2
| 34.709
| 4,3%
| 0
| 2
|-
| style="background-color:#7FFF00;" | 
| style="text-align:left;" | José Carlos Gutiérrez Vargas
| style="text-align:left;" | Without Fear Movement
| 11.530
| 1,2%
| 0
| 17.016
| 2,1%
| 0
| 0
|-
| style="background-color:yellow" | 
| style="text-align:left;" | Érika Oroza Werner
| style="text-align:left;" | Nationalist Citizen Force
| 8.937
| 0,9%
| 0
| 8.660
| 1,1%
| 0
| 0
|-
|
| colspan="2" style="text-align:right;" | Indigenous Representatives
| colspan="6" style="text-align:center;" | Elected through usos y costumbres
| style="text-align:right;" | 5
|-
| style="background-color:white" | 
| 
| style="text-align:left;" | Valid votes
| 979.123
| 93,0%
|
| 812.943
| 78,3%
|
|
|-
| style="background-color:white" | 
| 
| style="text-align:left;" | Blank votes
| style="text-align:right;" | 39.955
| style="text-align:right;" | 3,8%
|
| style="text-align:right;" | 203.015
| style="text-align:right;" | 19,5%
|
|
|-
| style="background-color:white" | 
| 
| style="text-align:left;" | Null votes
| style="text-align:right;" | 33.348
| style="text-align:right;" | 3,2%
|
| style="text-align:right;" | 22.929
| style="text-align:right;" | 2,2%
|
|
|-
| 
| 
| style="text-align:left;" | Total votes	
| style="text-align:right;" | 1.052.426
| style="text-align:right;" | 85,9% of registered voters
| style="text-align:right;" | 15
| style="text-align:right;" | 1.038.887
| style="text-align:right;" | 84,7% of registered voters
| style="text-align:right;" | 8
| style="text-align:right;" | 28
|-
| colspan="10" style="text-align:left;" | All party percentages are the percent of valid votes. Percentages of valid, blank, and null votes are the percent of total votes emitted. Source: Corte Nacional Electoral, Acto de Computo Nacional
|}

Tarija

|- style="background:#E9E9E9;"
! colspan="2" style="text-align:center;" | Gubernatorial Candidate
! style="text-align:center;" | Party
! style="text-align:center;" | Votes for Governor
! style="text-align:center;" | Percentage
! style="text-align:center;" | Assembly Members by Territory
! style="text-align:center;" | Assembly Members by Population
! style="text-align:center;" | Total Assembly Members	
|-
| style="background-color:orange" | 
| style="text-align:left;" | Mario Adel Cossio Cortez
| style="text-align:left;" | Path to Change (MNR - CDC - FRI alliance)
| 97.726
| 48,9%
| 5
| 6
| 11
|-
| style="background-color:blue" | 
| style="text-align:left;" | Carlos Cabrera
| style="text-align:left;" | Movement for Socialism
| 88.014
| 44,1%
| 5 
| 6
| 11
|-
| style="background-color:green" | 
| style="text-align:left;" | Edwin Flores
| style="text-align:left;" | National Power of Autonomy
| 13.909
| 7,0%
| 2
| 3
| 5
|-
|
| colspan="2" style="text-align:right;" | Indigenous Representatives
| colspan="4" style="text-align:center;" | Elected through usos y costumbres by the Guaraní, Weenhayek, and Tapiete peoples
| style="text-align:right;" | 3
|-
| style="background-color:white" | 
| 
| style="text-align:left;" | Valid votes
| 199.649
| 88,7%
|
|
|
|-
| style="background-color:white" | 
| 
| style="text-align:left;" | Blank votes
| style="text-align:right;" | 16.827
| style="text-align:right;" | 7,5%
|
|
|
|-
| style="background-color:white" | 
| 
| style="text-align:left;" | Null votes
| style="text-align:right;" | 8.574
| style="text-align:right;" | 3,8%
|
|
|
|-
| 
| 
| style="text-align:left;" | Total votes	
| style="text-align:right;" | 225.050
| style="text-align:right;" | 85,0% of registered voters
| style="text-align:right;" | 12
| style="text-align:right;" | 15
| style="text-align:right;" | 30
|-
| colspan="10" style="text-align:left;" | All party percentages are the percent of valid votes. Percentages of valid, blank, and null votes are the percent of total votes emitted. Source: Corte Nacional Electoral, Acto de Computo Nacional
|}

Mayors results
As of 12 April, MAS-IPSP had won the Mayor's race in 229 of the country's 337 municipalities. However, among major cities (the departmental capitals plus El Alto) it won just three, Cochabamba, Cobija (Pando Department), and El Alto. Without Fear Movement candidates will be Mayors of La Paz (Luis Revilla) and Oruro. Regional candidates won in the following major cities: Jaime Barrón (PAÍS) in Sucre, Óscar Montes (Unidos para Renovar) in Tarija, Percy Fernández in Santa Cruz, Moisés Shriqui (Beni First) in Trinidad, and René Joaquino (Social Alliance) in Potosí.

Other municipal results are as follows:

 In Beni department, Beni First won 8 of the 19 mayor's races, including the capital, Trinidad. The MAS-IPSP also won the race for mayor in 8 municipalities. The MNR-Pueblo alliance won the remaining three races.
 In Chuquisaca department, MAS-IPSP won 23 of the 29 mayor's races. The Without Fear Movement won in 3 municipalities: Culpina, Las Carreras, and Huacaya. Jaime Barrón of the Pact of Social Integration (PAÍS) won the capital, Sucre, defeating MAS candidate Ana María Quinteros. LIDER won in Huacareta and NA-C in Monteagudo.
 In Cochabamba department, the MAS-IPSP won mayor's races in 40 of the 47 municipalities, and a council majority in 39. Its candidate, Edwin Castellanos became the Mayor of Cercado Municipality (Cochabamba, the city) by defeating Arturo Murillo (All for Cochabamba, TPC). In the capital, MAS-IPSP and All for Cochabamba each hold 5 of the 11 council seats, with the last belonging to Front for Victory. The Without Fear Movement won the mayor's office in 3 municipalities, Colomi, Kuchumuela and Tolata, and has council members in 23 municipalities. MAS-IPSP holds the council majority in Colomi. Unity New Hope won the mayor's office in Quillacollo, as well as 5 seats on the council, joined by 5 MAS-IPSP council members, and one from Front for Victory. The Indígena Martín Uchu movement won the mayor's race and five of seven council seats in Punata. The ARI grouping won the mayor's seat and two of five council seats in San Benito (2 belong to MAS-IPSP; 1 to All for Cochabamba). The PUN grouping won both the mayor's race and a 3 of 5 council majority in Pasorapa. Pasorapa mayor elect Cintia Guisela Ávila and Toco mayor elect Janeth Flores Ferrufino are the only two women to head municipal governments. In accordance with the law of alternation among candidates, there are 272 women and 275 men among the council members.
 In La Paz department, the MAS-IPSP won the race for mayor in 58 municipalities: Achocalla, Ancoraimes, Santiago de Huata, Caquiaviri, Comanche, Charaña, Waldo Ballivián, Nazacara de Pacajes, Santiago de Callapa, Puerto Acosta, Mocomoco, Chuma, Aucapata, Guanay, Tacacoma, Tipuani, Teoponte, Pelechuco, Viacha, Guaqui, Tiwanaku, Desaguadero, Jesús de Machaca, Luribay, Yaco, Cairoma, Quime, Colquiri, Choca, Licoma Pampa, Irupana, Yanacachi, Palos Blancos, Laja, Batallas, Sica Sica, Ayo Ayo, Calamarca, Patacamaya, Colquencha, Collana, Coroico, Coripata, Ixiamas, San Buenaventura, Charazani, Curva, Copacabana, San Pedro de Tiquina, San Pedro de Curahuara Papel Pampa, Chacarilla, Santiago de Machaca, Catacora, Caranavi, Alto Beni and El Alto. The victory in El Alto was accomplished by Édgar Patana over Abel Mamani (MSM). The Without Fear Movement won in 7 municipalities: La Paz, Humanata, Quiabaya, Mapiri, Apolo, Malla and Tito Yupanqui. Luis "Lucho' Revilla was its successful candidate in the capital, defeating the MAS-IPSP's Elizabeth Salguero. The Movement for Sovereignty won in 6 municipalities: Achacachi, Mecapaca, Escoma, Sorata, Combaya, and Pucarani. The Patriotic Social Alliance won in the two municipalities of Ayata and Puerto Pérez. The Departmental Association of Coca Growers won in the two municipalities of Chulumani y Cajuata. The Front for Victory won in the two municipalities of Inquisivi y Sapahaqui. Other organizations won one municipality each: TP-A in La Asunta, Cumi in Calacoto, TS in Puerto Carabuco, CAOSAM in San Andrés de Machaca, and CAOTM in Taraco. Just 21 women contested for mayor in the 85 municipalities, and only five were elected.
 In Oruro department, MAS-IPSP won the mayor's office in 31 of the 35 municipalities. The Without Fear Movement won three, including the capital, Oruro.
 In Pando department, Popular Consensus won 8 of the 15 mayor's races. MAS-IPSP won the remaining seven, including the capital, Cobija. Ana Lucía Reis, an environmentalist and former Congressional Deputy affiliated with the MNR, is the new mayor of Cobija.
 In Potosí department, MAS-IPSP won the mayor's office in 34 of the 40 municipalities. The Without Fear Movement won three. Social Alliance won the capital, Potosí.
 In Santa Cruz department, MAS-IPSP won the mayor's office in 25 of the 56 municipalities. Truth and Social Democracy (VERDES) won 15 mayor's races. The Broad Front (MNR-APB) won three. Two mayor's races were won by the Chiquitana Indigenous Organization (Organización Indígena Chiquitana; OICH). The Without Fear Movement and several local political forces–SOL, NEGRO, VOCES, LIDER, SAN, CHINO, MATICO, MANOS, and GH–each won one.
 In Tarija department, MAS-IPSP won 5 of the 11 mayor's races: : Caraparí, El Puente, San Lorenzo, Yunchará, and Padcaya. Six other political forces each won one: UNIR in the capital, Path Towards Change in Concepción, MAR in Bermejo, PAN in Yacuiba, RHP in Villa Montes, and ARO in Entre Ríos.

References

Elections in Bolivia
2010 elections in South America
General